Damase "Dan" David Bouvier (March 27, 1929 – July 7, 1976) was a provincial level politician from Alberta, Canada. He served as a member of the Legislative Assembly of Alberta from 1968 to 1975 sitting with the Social Credit caucus in both government and opposition and also briefly as an Independent.

References

External links
Legislative Assembly of Alberta Members Listing

Alberta Social Credit Party MLAs
Independent Alberta MLAs
1929 births
1976 deaths
Franco-Albertan people